The MIT School of Architecture and Planning (MIT SAP, stylized as SA+P) is one of the five schools of the Massachusetts Institute of Technology, located in Cambridge, Massachusetts. Founded in 1865 by William Robert Ware, the school offered the first formal architectural curriculum in the United States, and the first architecture program in the world operating within the establishment of a university. MIT SAP is considered a global academic leader in the design field and one of the most accomplished schools in the world. 
MIT's department of architecture has consistently ranked among the top architecture/built environment schools in the world, and from 2015 to 2018 was ranked highest in the world in QS World University Rankings. In 2019, it was ranked second to The Bartlett but regained the number one position later on in the 2020 rankings.

In the 20th century, the school came to be known by introducing modernism to America. MIT has a history of commissioning progressive buildings, many of which were designed by faculty or former students associated with the school. In recent years, the campus of the Massachusetts Institute of Technology has been expanded with a mix of modernist and post-modernist buildings.

Since 2015, the Dean of Architecture and Planning is Hashim Sarkis.

History

Architecture
The Architecture program at the Massachusetts Institute of Technology was founded in 1865, with the first courses taught in 1868. Despite its founding within a technical school, the architecture program began as a course of general study that was more closely aligned with the liberal arts. William Robert Ware modeled the school as a modified version of the École des Beaux-Arts in Paris, entrusting the program's design leadership to Eugene Letang, a French graduate of the École who was a strict teacher of precise draftsmanship and clear composition.

In 1932, when MIT President Karl T. Compton reorganized the institute's academic structure, the School of Architecture was formally established, incorporating the department of architecture. The head of the department of architecture, William Emerson, then proceeded to become the first dean of the School of Architecture.

Planning
Urban Studies and Planning was originally a department within the School of Architecture at the Massachusetts Institute of Technology. The City Planning program was first offered in September 1933.

In 1944 the school was renamed as the ‘School of Architecture and Planning’. 

In 1947, the Department of City and Regional Planning was established, which was renamed the Department of Urban Studies and Planning (DUSP) in 1969.

Media Lab

The MIT Media Lab was organized in 1980 by Professor Nicholas Negroponte and former MIT President and Science Advisor to President John F. Kennedy, Jerome Wiesner. The Lab grew out of the work of MIT's Architecture Machine Group, and remains within MIT's School of Architecture and Planning.

Devoted to research projects at the convergence of multimedia and technology, the Media Lab was widely popularized in the 1990s by business and technology publications such as Wired and Red Herring for a series of innovative but practical inventions in the fields of wireless networks, field sensing, web browsers, and the World Wide Web. The Media Lab works primarily on the theory and real-world implementation of physical-virtual interface. As Negroponte envisioned it, interface has become an architectural problem. There have been numerous research spinoffs of the Media Lab, including One Laptop per Child (OLPC), Electronic Ink, and LEGO Mindstorms.

Visual Arts

The MIT Program in Art, Culture and Technology (ACT), hosted by the department of architecture, was created in the summer of 2009 by the merger of the Visual Arts Program (VAP) and the Center for Advanced Visual Studies (CAVS). The CAVS, now renamed the ACT Fellows program, was founded in 1968 with György Kepes as the director. The CAVS had the goal of encouraging collaboration among artists, scientists, and engineers, and it served as a precursor to the MIT Media Lab decades later. The successor ACT Fellows program continues as a research center for practicing artists.

Center for Real Estate
The MIT Center for Real Estate was established in 1983, with the aim of improving the quality of the built environment. An intensive one-year program leads to a Master of Science in Real Estate degree.

Deans of MIT School of Architecture and Planning

Academic and research programs

Undergraduate education

Undergraduates are admitted MIT-wide, and are not expected to formally declare a major until the end of the freshman or sophomore year. All MIT undergrads must satisfy the General Institute Requirements regardless of major, as well as more-specialized departmental requirements. SAP undergrads normally are affiliated with the architecture department (Course 4) or the Department of Urban Studies and Planning (DUSP, Course 11). All MIT undergrads may freely register for any courses on a university-wide basis, including graduate-level courses, providing that they have satisfied any course prerequisites.

Architecture
The department of architecture is divided into five main research areas:1. Architectural Design; 2. Building Technology; 3.  Design and Computation; 4. History, Theory and Criticism of Architecture and Art (for which MIT was the first to establish such a program); 5. The Art, Culture and Technology program. Further, there are three special research groups: Aga Khan Program for Islamic Architecture (in partnership with Harvard University), the Center for Real Estate and the Special Interest Group in Urban Settlements.

The department offers several degrees, including:
 Bachelor of Science in Art and Design (BSAD)
 Bachelor of Science (BS) as pre-professional, undergraduate degrees 
 Master of Architecture (MArch) 
 Master of Science in Architecture Studies (SMArchS) with a specialization in the school's five main research areas
 Building Technology
 Design
 Computation
 History and Theory of Architecture
 Urbanism
 Master of Science in Building Technology (SMBT) 
 Master of Science in Art, Culture and Technology (SMACT) 
 Doctor of Philosophy in Architecture (PhD) degree with specialization in
 Building Technology
 Design and Computation
 History and Theory of Architecture
 History and Theory of Art

Nicholas de Monchaux has been the chair of the architecture department since 2020.

Media Laboratory
The MIT Media Lab Program in Media Arts and Sciences (MAS) offers two degrees
 Master of Science 
 Doctor of Philosophy in Media Arts and Sciences

Urban Studies and Planning
The Department of Urban Studies and Planning (DUSP) has four specialization areas: City Design and Development; Environmental Policy; Housing, Community and Economic Development; and the International Development Group. There are also three cross-cutting areas of study: Transportation Planning and Policy; Urban Information Systems (UIS); and Regional Planning.

The Department of Urban Studies and Planning offers the following degrees
 Master in City Planning (MCP) 
 PhD in Urban and Regional Studies
 PhD in Urban and Regional Planning
 Bachelor of Science (SB) in Planning 
 Bachelor of Science (SB) in Bachelor of Urban Science and Planning with Computer Science
 a five-year SB/MCP
 minors in Public Policy and in Urban Studies and Planning.

Center for Real Estate
The MIT Center for Real Estate was established in 1983 with the aim of improving the quality of the built environment. An intensive one-year program leads to a Master of Science in Real Estate degree.

Morningside Academy for Design 
The MIT Morningside Academy for Design was established in 2022 as an interdisciplinary center to foster academic and research programs across MIT, especially between the School of Architecture and Planning and the MIT School of Engineering.

Financial support
A substantial portion of the annual budget, which supports half tuition and full-tuition scholarships in addition to the school's costs, is generated through donations from alumni in both the public and the private sector. Students also have the opportunity to be fully funded when traveling abroad through MISTI.

Rankings
For four consecutive years from 2015 to 2018, the MIT Architecture Department received the top world ranking from QS World University Rankings. In the 2019/2020 rankings, the department was ranked 2nd in the world. In the 2020/2021 rankings, MIT regained the top position once again.

, Design Intelligence ranked the MIT MArch program in 2nd place. The program's ten-year average ranking places it 4th overall, on its ranking of programs accredited by the National Architectural Accrediting Board. In 2018, Design Intelligence ranked MIT among the top three Most Admired Architecture Schools at the graduate level.

As of 2017, MIT's Department of Urban Studies and Planning ranks #1 in North America for graduate programs in urban planning, according to Planetizen.

Research, projects and partnerships
In addition to its degree programs, MIT administers research initiatives in design, technology, history and structure. The school publishes the annual peer-reviewed journal Thresholds and Building Discourse, and other design books and studio works.

MIT@Lawrence
MIT@Lawrence is a partnership among MIT, several Lawrence, Massachusetts-based community organizations, and the City of Lawrence. The partnership is aimed at facilitating affordable housing development, building community assets, and improving youth pathways to advancement. It is funded by the United States Department of Housing and Urban Development (HUD).

MIT Senseable City Lab

The MIT Senseable City Laboratory aims to investigate and anticipate how digital technologies are changing the way people live and their implications at the urban scale. Director Carlo Ratti founded the Senseable City Lab in 2004 within the City Design and Development group at the Department of Urban Studies and Planning, as well as in collaboration with the MIT Media Lab. Recent projects include "The Copenhagen Wheel" which debuted at the 2009 United Nations Climate Change Conference, "Trash_Track"  shown at the Architectural League of New York and the Seattle Public Library, "New York Talk Exchange"  featured in the MoMA The Museum of Modern Art, and Real Time Rome included in the 2006 Venice Biennale of Architecture.

Campus
Uncommon to design education, MIT's programs are integrated with the greater university in curriculum, resources, and campus. The network of contiguous buildings that combines to create the campus fosters sharing of common spaces and circulations with neighboring fields of study.

Rogers Building
Most of the school facilities are located in or near the Rogers Building, at the main entrance to the central MIT campus (chiefly designed by William Welles Bosworth; the hallway spaces have been nicknamed the Infinite Corridor. The fourth floor western end of the Infinite Corridor is lined with studio spaces and classrooms, while other classrooms are dispersed throughout the campus. The "glass bowl" nature of many of the architectural spaces lining the Infinite Corridor invites colleagues across the school for observation and collaboration.

Venues along the Infinite Corridor display exhibits that regularly feature the work of faculty, researchers, and students. Additional SAP exhibits may be seen at the MIT Museum, Wolk Gallery, Keller Gallery, Deans Office Gallery, Rotch Library, and the PLAZmA Digital Gallery.

Rotch Library
Originally built in 1938 as part of the Rogers Building (designed by William Welles Bosworth with Harry J. Carlson), MIT's Rotch Library of Architecture and Planning is one of the premier architecture libraries in the United States, supporting the first formal architecture program in the country. Rotch Library is also home to the Aga Khan Documentation Center, the GIS Lab, the Visual Collection, and the Rotch Limited Access collections.

Although the library acquired an additional half-floor of space in the mid-1950s, the collection had outgrown its  facility by the 1970s. The only available expansion space was a narrow vertical cavity next to the original library. Schwartz/Silver Architects decided to suspend newly added floors from roof girders which support the weight of the books from above, allowing the elimination of floor beams to maximize use of the narrow footprint. Six new floors were fitted into the same height as the four of the original building, while still allowing for a  vertical clearance for a truck turnaround below. A narrow, sky-lit atrium between the old building and the new addition allows sunlight to reach offices and studios in the upper floors, mitigating the unavoidable loss of exterior views. The result is an addition that has been referred to as a "glass cage", which contains the book stacks, limited-access collection, and exhibition gallery, while the renovated original Bosworth building holds the main reading room and administrative offices.

Fab Labs
MIT SAP has access to multiple fab labs, including two along the Infinite Corridor, a woodshop in Building N51 (several blocks away), the Media Lab shop (in Building E14), the Design Center Lab, and other spaces. There is a smartphone app to allow students and staff to locate resources campus-wide, and to coordinate access to fab facilities.

Media Lab buildings
At the eastern end of the campus, the Wiesner building (E15, designed by I.M.Pei) mainly houses the Media Lab programs, the List Visual Arts Center, the School of Architecture and Planning's Program in Art, Culture and Technology (ACT), and MIT's Program in Comparative Media Studies (CMS).

In 2009, the Media Lab expanded into a new building (E14) designed by Pritzker Prize-winning Japanese architect Fumihiko Maki. The local architect of record is Leers Weinzapfel Associates, of Boston. The , six-story building features an open, atelier-style, adaptable architecture specifically designed to provide the flexibility to respond to emerging research priorities. High levels of transparency throughout the building's interior make ongoing research visible, encouraging connections and collaboration among researchers. The two buildings are closely interconnected on several levels, allowing free movement between interior spaces.

Distinguished alumni and faculty

Notable Alumni

Current faculty

Former faculty

References

Further reading
Paul Bennett, "Landscape Organism: The West Philadelphia Landscape Project", Landscape Architecture (March 2000): 66–71, 82.
Campbell, Glenn, "Learning Gets Real With Service", Philadelphia Daily News, May 7, 1998.
Steve Curwood, "Nature in the City: Redesigning the Granite Garden", Living on Earth, National Public Radio, 1993 
Anne Whiston Spirn, "Restoring Mill Creek: Landscape Literacy, Environmental Justice, and City Planning and Design", Landscape Research 30:5 (July 2005): pp. 359–377. PDF
Anne Whiston Spirn, The Language of Landscape, Yale University Press, 1998.
Keiko Takayama, "The West Philadelphia Landscape Project" , Bio-City 17 (November 1999), pp. 57–67.

External links
 

Massachusetts Institute of Technology
Architecture schools in Massachusetts
Educational institutions established in 1865
1865 establishments in Massachusetts
University subdivisions in Massachusetts